Nathan Spencer may refer to:

Nathan Spencer (Casualty) a fictional character from Casualty
Nathan "Rad" Spencer, the protagonist of the Bionic Commando series
Nathan Spencer (Rugby) Selby 3rd Team Centre/Ballet Dancer